Salinas may refer to:

People
Salinas (surname)

Places

Americas

Latin America 
 Salinas (ancient lake), in the Salar de Uyuni, Bolivia
 Salinas, Minas Gerais, a municipality in the state of Minas Gerais, Brazil
 Playa Grande, Costa Rica, a beach town, also known as Salinas
 Las Salinas, town in the Dominican Republic
 Salinas de Guaranda, an Andean mountain village in Ecuador
 Salinas, Ecuador, a coastal city in Santa Elena, Ecuador
 Salinas Victoria, a municipality in the state of Nuevo León, Mexico
 Salinas de Hidalgo, in the Mexican state of San Luis Potosí
Salinas y Aguada Blanca National Reserve, Peru
 Salinas Lake, a salt lake in Arequipa Province, Peru
 Salinas, Puerto Rico, a municipality in the south coast of Puerto Rico
 Salinas, Uruguay, a town in Uruguay

United States 

 Salinas River (California)
 Salinas Valley, in Monterey County, California
 Salinas, California, the county seat and largest municipality of Monterey County
 Salinas Assembly Center, a temporary detention camp for citizens and immigrant residents of Japanese ancestry during World War II
 Salinas station, the train depot serving Salinas.

Spain 

 Salinas, Alicante, a municipality in Alicante province
 Salinas de Añana, Álava, a municipality in Álava
 Salinas de Léniz (Leintz-Gatzaga in Basque), a municipality in Guipúzcoa
 Salinas de Oro, a municipality in Navarre
 Salinas de Ibiza
 Salinas (Castrillón), a parish in the council of Castrillón, Asturias
 Salinas (Canarias / Las Palmas), a parish in the council of Gran Canarias, Islas Canarias

Philippines 

 Salinas, an alternate name for the municipality of Rosario, Cavite
 Salinas Natural Monument, a protected area in Nueva Vizcaya

See also
Salinas River (disambiguation)
Salina (disambiguation)
Salinan, a native people and language of Monterey County, California